AKM Enamul Hoque Shameem (born 29 March 1965) is a Bangladesh Awami League politician and the incumbent deputy minister of the ministry of Water Resources. He is also the member of Parliament from Shariatpur-2.

Career
Shameem was elected to Parliament on 30 December 2018 from Shariatpur-2 as a Bangladesh Awami League candidate. He was appointed Deputy Minister of Water Resources. He was voted VP of JUCSU (Jahangirnagar University Central Student Union) from 1989 to 1991. He led Bangladesh Chhatra League (student league) as the President from 1994 to 1998. He was also a member of the central committee of Bangladesh Awami League and served as the Organising Secretary of Bangladesh Awami League. He is the founder of Port City International University. His brother AKM Aminul Haque is a serving Major General of Bangladesh Army.

References

Living people
1965 births
Jahangirnagar University alumni
Awami League politicians
11th Jatiya Sangsad members
People from Bhedarganj Upazila
Deputy Ministers of Water Resources (Bangladesh)